Francesco Zucchetti (14 April 1902 – 8 February 1980) was an Italian racing cyclist and olympic champion in track cycling. He won a gold medal in the team pursuit at the 1924 Summer Olympics in Paris.

References

External links

1902 births
1980 deaths
People from Cernusco sul Naviglio
Italian male cyclists
Olympic gold medalists for Italy
Cyclists at the 1924 Summer Olympics
Olympic cyclists of Italy
Italian track cyclists
Olympic medalists in cycling
Medalists at the 1924 Summer Olympics
Cyclists from the Metropolitan City of Milan